"Creative Democracy: The Task Before Us" is a 1939 essay by American philosopher John Dewey.  Dewey's essay was originally delivered as a speech by philosopher Horace Kallen on October 20, 1939, at a dinner in honor of Dewey's 80th birthday that he was unable to attend.  Dewey argues that democracy is a way of life and an experience built on faith in human nature, faith in human beings, and faith in working with others.  Democracy, in Dewey's view, is a moral ideal requiring actual effort and work by people; it is not an institutional concept that exists outside of ourselves.  "The task of democracy", Dewey concludes, "is forever that of creation of a freer and more humane experience in which all share and to which all contribute."

Publication history
Dewey, John. 1939. John Dewey and the Promise of America, Progressive Education Booklet No. 14. Columbus, Ohio: American Education Press.

See also
Associative democracy
Deliberative democracy
The Public and its Problems

Notes

References
Bernstein, Richard J. 2000. Creative Democracy—The Task Still Before Us. American Journal of Theology & Philosophy 21, no. 3 (September): 215–228. 
Kadlec, Alison. 2007. Dewey's Critical Pragmatism. Lexington Books. .

External links

 Collection of Dewey Essays at Archive.org containing Creative Democracy

1939 documents
Works by John Dewey